Sturgis is a town of 620 people in east central Saskatchewan, Canada.  The Town of Sturgis is 95 km north of Yorkton on Highway 9.  It is located in the Assiniboine river valley near the lakes and woods region of the province.

The community was named for Sturgis, South Dakota, where Fred Clyde Brooks, the first postmaster, had been raised.

The Sturgis railway station receives scheduled Via Rail service.

Demographics 

In 2011, the median age of the population in Sturgis increased in 2001 to 51.2 years of age versus 49.7 in 2006. The median age of the division was 46.1 in 2011 and 38.2 for the province.

Economy
 
 Chamber of Commerce
 Sturgis Economic Development Corp.
 Sturgis Tourist Information Booth

Attractions
 Station House Museum
 Skating and Curling Rinks
 Sturgis & District Community Hall
 Sturgis Ski Hill
 Lady Lake Regional Park

Churches
 Grace United Church
 Kingdom Hall of Jehovah's Witnesses
 St. Patrick's Roman Catholic Church
 Evangelical Church
 Ukrainian Greek Orthodox Church

Education
Sturgis is home to Sturgis Elementary School and Sturgis Composite High School a part of the Good Spirit School Division No. 204

 Parkland Regional Library - Sturgis Branch
 The Kinette Club of Sturgis Nursery School
 Good Spirit School Division Band

See also 

 List of communities in Saskatchewan
 List of towns in Saskatchewan

References

External links

Towns in Saskatchewan
Division No. 9, Saskatchewan